Silver Screen is a science fiction novel by Justina Robson, first published by Macmillan in 1999. It features Anjuli O'Connell, employed as a psychologist to monitor an artificial intelligence named 901. She has a photographic memory and perfect recall. The story concerns events following the death of Roy Croft, Anjuli's colleague and friend. The book's themes include machine rights and evolution.

1999 British novels
English novels
1999 science fiction novels
British science fiction novels
Macmillan Publishers books